New Columbia is a name proposed by the District of Columbia statehood movement since 1983.

New Columbia may also refer to:

 New Columbia (Portland, Oregon), a mixed-income housing development in the United States
 New Columbia, Illinois, an unincorporated community in the United States
 New Columbia, Pennsylvania, a census-designated place in the United States
 New Columbia, a name given to Wrangel Island by Captain Calvin L. Hooper of the Revenue cutter USRC Thomas Corwin
 The New Columbia Movement, a Christian Nationalist movement based in the United States; see